In archaeogenetics, the term Scandinavian Hunter-Gatherer (SHG) is the name given to a distinct ancestral component that represents descent from Mesolithic hunter-gatherers of Scandinavia. Genetic studies suggest that the SHGs were a mix of Western Hunter-Gatherers (WHGs) initially populating Scandinavia from the south during the Holocene, and Eastern Hunter-Gatherers (EHGs), who later entered Scandinavia from the north along the Norwegian coast. During the Neolithic, they admixed further with Early European Farmers (EEFs) and Western Steppe Herders (WSHs). Genetic continuity has been detected between the SHGs and members of the Pitted Ware culture (PWC), and to a certain degree, between SHGs and modern northern Europeans. The Sámi, on the other hand, have been found to be completely unrelated to PWC.

Research 
Scandinavian Hunter-Gatherers (SHG) were identified as a distinct ancestral component in a study published in Nature in 2014. A number of remains examined at Motala, Sweden, and a separate group of remains from 5,000 year-old hunter-gatherers of the Pitted Ware culture (PWC), were identified as belonging to SHG. The study found that an SHG individual from Motala ('Motala12') could be successfully modelled as being of 81% Western Hunter-Gatherer (WHG) ancestry, and 19% Ancient North Eurasian (ANE) ancestry.

A genetic study published in Nature in March 2015 examined the remains of six SHGs buried at Motala between ca. 6000 BC and 5700 BC. Of the four males surveyed, three carried the paternal haplogroup I2a1 or various subclades of it, while the other carried I2c. With regard to mtDNA, four individuals carried subclades of U5a, while two carried U2e1. The study found SHGs to constitute one of the three main hunter-gatherer populations of Europe during the Holocene. The two other groups were WHGs and EHGs (Eastern Hunter-Gatherers), between whom SHGs formed a distinct cluster. SHGs living between 6000 BC and 3000 BC were found to largely be genetically homogenous, with little admixture occurring among them during this period. EHGs were found to be more closely related to SHGs than WHGs.

In a genetic study published in Nature in November 2015, the six SHGs from Motala were subjected to further analysis. The study found it possible to model SHGs as a mixture of WHGs and EHGs. SHGs appeared to have persisted in Scandinavia until after 5,000 years ago. Results from studies of SHGs were found to be surprising. The Motala SHGs were found to be closely related to WHGs.

A genetic study published in Nature in July 2016 found SHGs to be a mix of EHGs and WHGs. WHGs were in turn a mix of EHGs and the Upper Paleolithic people (Cro-Magnon) of the Grotte du Bichon in Switzerland. EHGs derived 75% of their ancestry from ANEs.

In a genetic study published in PLOS Biology in January 2018, the remains of seven SHGs were examined. All three samples of Y-DNA extracted belonged to subclades of I2. With respects to mtDNA, four samples belonged to U5a1 haplotypes, while three samples belonged U4a2 haplotypes. All samples from western and northern Scandinavia carried U5a1 haplotypes, while all the samples from eastern Scandinavia except from one carried U4a2 haplotypes. The authors of the study suggested that SHGs were descended from a WHG population that had entered Scandinavia from the south, and an EHG population which had entered Scandinavia from the northeast along the coast. The WHGs who entered Scandinavia are believed to have belonged to the Ahrensburg culture. These WHGs and EHGs had subsequently mixed, and the SHGs gradually developed their distinct character. The SHGs from western and northern Scandinavia had more EHG ancestry (ca 49%) than individuals from eastern Scandinavia (ca. 38%). The SHGs were found to have a genetic adaptation to high latitude environments, including high frequencies of low pigmentation variants and genes designed for adaptation to the cold and physical performance. SHGs displayed a high frequency of the depigmentation alleles SLC45A2 and SLC24A5, and the OCA/Herc2, which affects eye pigmentation. These genes were much less common among WHGs and EHGs. A surprising continuity was displayed between SHGs and modern populations of Northern Europe in certain respects. Most notably, the presence of the protein TMEM131 among SHGs and modern Northern Europeans was detected. This protein may be involved in long-term adaptation to the cold.

In a genetic study published in Nature Communications in January 2018, the remains of an SHG female at Motala, Sweden between 5750 BC and 5650 BC was analyzed. She was found to be carrying U5a2d and "substantial ANE ancestry". The study found that Mesolithic hunter-gatherers of the eastern Baltic also carried high frequencies of the HERC2 allele, and increased frequencies of the SLC45A2 and SLC24A5 alleles. They however harbored less EHG ancestry than SHGs. Genetic continuity between the SHGs and the Pitted Ware culture of the Neolithic was detected. The results further underpinned previous suggestion that SHGs were descended from northward migration of WHGs and a subsequent southward migration of EHGs. A certain degree of continuity between SHGs and northern Europeans was detected.

A study published in Nature in February 2018 included an analysis of a large number of individuals of prehistoric Eastern Europe. Thirty-seven samples were collected from Mesolithic and Neolithic Ukraine (9500–6000 BC). These were determined to be an intermediate between EHG and SHG. Samples of Y-DNA extracted from these individuals belonged exclusively to R haplotypes (particularly subclades of R1b1 and R1a)) and I haplotypes (particularly subclades of I2). mtDNA belonged almost exclusively to U (particularly subclades of U5 and U4).

Physical appearance 
According to Mathieson, et al. (2015), 50% of Scandinavian Hunter Gatherers from from Motala carried the derived variant of EDAR-V370A. This variant is typical of modern East Asian populations, and is known to affect dental morphology and hair texture, and also chin protrusion and ear morphology, as well as other facial features. The authors did not detect East Asian ancestry in the Scandinavian Hunter Gatherers, and speculated that this gene might not have originated in East Asia, as is commonly believed. However, more recent research incorporating ancient Northeast Asian samples has confirmed that EDAR-V370A originated in Northeast Asia, and spread to West Eurasian populations such as Motala in the Holocene period.

A study by Günther et al. (2018) found that SHGs "show a combination of eye color varying from blue to light brown and light skin pigmentation. This is strikingly different from the WHGs—who have been suggested to have the specific combination of blue eyes and dark skin and EHGs—who have been suggested to be brown-eyed and light-skinned".

Four SHGs from the study yielded diverse eye and hair pigmentation predictions: one individual (SF12) was predicted to be most likely to have had dark hair and blue eyes; a second individual (Hum2) most likely had dark hair and brown eyes; a third (SF9) was predicted to have had light hair and brown eyes; and a fourth individual (SBj) was predicted to have had light hair, with the most likely hair colour being blonde, and blue eyes.

Of the SHGs from Motala, four were probably dark-haired, and two others were probably light-haired, and may have been blond. In addition, all of the six SHGs from Motala had high probabilities of being blue-eyed.

Both light and dark skin pigmentation alleles are found at intermediate frequencies in the Scandinavian Hunter Gatherers sampled, but only one individual had exclusively light-skin variants of two different SNPs.

The study found that depigmentation variants of genes for skin pigmentation (SLC24A5, SLC45A2) and eye pigmentation (OCA2/HERC2) are found at high frequency in SHGs relative to WHGs and EHGs, which the study suggests cannot be explained simply as a result of the admixture of WHGs and EHGs. The study argues that these allele frequencies must have continued to increase in SHGs after admixture, which was probably caused by environmental adaptation to high latitudes.

On the basis of archaeological and genetic evidence, the Swedish archaeologist Oscar D. Nilsson has made forensic reconstructions of both male and female SHGs.

See also 
 Caucasus Hunter-Gatherer

Notes

References

Bibliography

Further reading 

 
 
 
 

SHG
Genetic history of Europe
Peopling of the world
Indo-European genetics
Last Glacial Maximum
Mesolithic